The Amazing Adventures of DJ Yoda is the fourth studio album mixed by DJ Yoda.

Track listing
Intro
He's A Nutbag
Wheels
Fertilizer
Breakfast Cereal ft. Biz Markie
Yoda In Reverse
Playin' Around ft. Jungle Brothers
Cuban Brothers FM
Let's Get Old ft. Princess Superstar
Fiddy
Holdin' Down The Block ft. Andy Cooper
Haunted House ft. Biz Markie
Bargain Hunters
Chatterbox ft. Sway
Tip Toe
Luke's Advice
Brush Off ft. Aspects
Zipper Scratch
Fresh Fly Fellas ft. Apathy, Kwest & Celph Titled
Duellin' Banjos
SALAAM ft. MC Paul Barman
Just Practising
Pussy Cat ft. Mr. David Viner
Darn That's The End
Muted Cartoons ft. Akinyele

References

DJ Yoda albums
DJ mix albums
2006 compilation albums